Tomkins may refer to:

 Tomkins (surname)
 Tomkins plc, an engineering company
Tomkins Cove, New York, a hamlet in the United States
Tomkins Knob, a mountain in North Carolina, United States
Tomkins Medal, an Australian rules football award
McCallum–Tomkins Medal, an Australian rules football award
Tomkins incident a 2004 attack on Aboriginal boys in Australia

See also
Tomkin (disambiguation)
Tompkins (disambiguation)